The Lacus Curtius ("Lake Curtius") was a mysterious pit or pool in the ground in the Forum Romanum. The area where the Forum would later be built was originally likely a lake, as the area it was in is known to have been surrounded by brooks and marshes. One part of the area was never drained, but gradually became smaller until only a basin, known as the Lacus Curtius, was left. Its nature and significance in Rome's early history is uncertain, and several conflicting stories exist about its history.

The name of the place is likely connected with the Curtia gens, a very old Roman Family with Sabine origins.

History
The history of the area wasn't well known even to the Romans, and at least three different explanations were given for the area's name. Two were given by Livy, and another by Varro. By order of when they are said to have taken place:

Livy's Sabine war origin

According to the oldest story (8th century BCE), Lacus Curtius was named after the champion of the Sabines, a horseman named Mettius Curtius. In the war that followed the Rape of the Sabine Women, the champion was said to have got stuck in the marsh during battle. This is corroborated by the fact that the area was once marshland, the fact that the Curtia Gens was of Sabine origins, and that the name Mettius was an authentic Sabine name rendered from the word medìss "leader".

Varro's lightning origin
A second version (~445 BCE), and also the most prosaic, had it that Gaius Curtius Philon, a consul, consecrated the site after a lightning strike had hit it.

Livy's mythical origin

Lacus Curtius may have been regarded with some veneration by ancient Romans. The most popular story (~362 BCE), and also the one Livy deemed most likely, was of a myth glorifying the nation: Rome was endangered when a great chasm opened on the Forum. An oracle told the people that they were to throw into the chasm "that what constituted the greatest strength of the Roman people," and that if they did the Roman nation would last forever. After dropping many things into the ravine without result, a young horseman named Marcus Curtius (again a member of the Curtia gens) saved the city by realizing that it was youth that the Romans held most dear. He jumped in, in full armour on his horse, whereupon the earth closed over him and Rome was saved. The story, though clearly epic in nature, was likely a copy of another very similar Greek story concerning king Midas.

Other possibilities
A bit to the east of the Lacus Curtius, skeletal remains were discovered of a man, woman and child who had been bound together and drowned. The stories about Mettius and Marcus Curtius may have been warped recollections of a very ancient sacrificial drowning ritual done when the area was still large enough to form a pool. Alternatively, they could have been related to "profaners" mentioned in the inscription on the nearby Lapis Niger, making it a special location of punishment.

The theme is related to high-medieval Celtic stories about lake-bursts.

In art

Marcus Curtius' self sacrifice has been a popular theme since the Renaissance, depicted by Paolo Veronese, Lucas Cranach the Elder and many others.

Related links
Curtia Gens

References

External links

Article by Samuel Ball Platner, with photographs
Lacus Curtius article on livius.org

Roman mythology
Topography of the ancient city of Rome
Roman Forum
Rome R. X Campitelli